Yasushi Furukawa may refer to:

 Yasushi Furukawa (governor) (born 1958), governor of Saga Prefecture in Japan
 Yasushi Furukawa (volleyball) (born 1961), Japanese former volleyball player